is a branch of Jōdo-shū Buddhism that was founded by Hōnen's disciple, Shōkū. Shōkū often went by the name Seizan as well, however the name derives from the western mountains of Kyoto where Shōkū often dwelt.  The main temple of this branch of Buddhism is at the temple of Eikandō in the city of Kyoto.  The temple formerly served as a Shingon Buddhist temple, but when Jōhen headed the temple, he took an interest in Jōdo Buddhism (originally in order to criticize it), designated Hōnen as the 11th chief priest.  Later, Hōnen's disciple became the head priest of Eikan-dō, and established the Seizan branch, fully converting the temple into a Jōdo one.

Doctrine

As a branch of Jōdo, the central practice is devotion to Amida Buddha, and recitation of the nembutsu.  Shōkū coined the term shiraki no nembutsu, which refers to a practice where one devotes themselves to intense study of Buddhist literature, and then recites the nembutsu with deep, sincere faith.  The idea behind shiraki no nembutsu is to demonstrate that in the age of Mappo, people cannot achieve Enlightenment on their own, and so they should rely on the compassion of Amida Buddha.

Seizan Buddhism also seems to incorporate techniques from the Shingon and Tendai sects including the use of mandala (such as the famous Taima Mandala), and other ascetic practices.  Shōkū, its founder, was said to recite the nembutsu 60,000 times a day and would endure other ascetic practices.  Unlike some of Hōnen's disciples, such as Kōsai, who attempted to eschew other Buddhist practices in favor of the nembutsu, the Seizan branch attempted to organize all Buddhist practices into a hierarchy, with the nembutsu being the foremost practice.  This is a similar approach to that found in Shingon, Tendai and Kegon sects of Buddhism.

In Seizan thought, it is thought that practices other than the nembutsu do contain some merit, but not equal to even one recitation of the nembutsu.

References

External links
 Eikandō's official website Contains history of Jōdo Shū, the Seizan branch and Shōkū
 Jodo Shu Research Institute (1996-2006). History of Honen's Disciples

Jōdo-shū